Ong Ai Leng (born 2 November 1978) is a Malaysian actress based in Singapore.

Career
Ong made her acting debut in Malaysia in 2002 before moving to Singapore. She has acted in both English and Chinese language dramas and in Singapore-Malaysia co-productions.

Ong collaborated with fellow Mediacorp artistes Jeff Wang and Apple Hong in opening a chain of Taiwanese street snack shops across Singapore called "Xiao Bar Wang" 小霸王 owned by Wang. She also owns several freelance businesses in Malaysia.

Ong left the entertainment industry after opted not to renew her contract with Mediacorp in 2010.

Personal life 
Ong was high school classmates with Zen Chong.

Ong married Hongkong director Kenne Yam in 2013.

Filmography

References

External links
Profile on xin.msn.com

Singaporean television actresses
Living people
1978 births
Malaysian people of Hokkien descent
Malaysian people of Chinese descent
Malaysian actresses
People from Kuala Lumpur